"Rock My Heart" is a song by Trinidadian-German musician Haddaway, released in March 1994 as the fourth and final single from his debut album, The Album (1993). It was written and produced by Dee Dee Halligan and Junior Torello. Like the previous single "I Miss You", the song was a hit in several countries, particularly in the UK, Germany, Finland, Switzerland, Ireland and Belgium, where it reached the top 10. In Israel, it peaked at number one for two weeks. "Rock My Heart" shot into the Eurochart Hot 100 at number 17 on 9 April 1994 and peaked at seven four weeks later.

Critical reception 
AllMusic editor Jose F. Promis wrote that "Rock My Heart" "shine just as brightly" as "What Is Love" and "Life". A reviewer from Billboard deemed the song "among the most potent offerings" from the album. Pan-European magazine Music & Media noted that "escorted by his steady female background singers, Haddaway bounces like a pinball wizard on a synthesiser trampoline." Alan Jones from Music Week gave it four out of five, writing, "This busy bounder is more akin to the happy house style of What Is Love and Life, though with some Cappella-like synth phrases. As with all Haddaway songs, it's more contagious than the common cold." The Reading Evening Post called the song "effervescent", adding that it "should follow his others into the charts". They also wrote that "he undeniably has a way with this sort of repetitive Euro synth pop." James Hamilton from the RM Dance Update declared it as a "typically cheesy 130bpm Euro galloper".

Chart performance 
"Rock My Heart" reached the top 10 in Belgium, Denmark, Finland, Germany, Ireland, Scotland, Switzerland and the United Kingdom. In the latter, the single peaked at number nine on 10 April 1994, during its third week at the UK Singles Chart, spending two weeks at that position. On the UK Dance Singles Chart, it reached number eight. Additionally, it climbed into the top 20 in Austria, France, the Netherlands, Spain and Sweden. While in Italy, the song was a top 30 hit, peaking at number 21. On the Eurochart Hot 100, "Rock My Heart" went to number seven. Outside Europe, it hit number-one in Israel, with two weeks at the top. It also reached number seven on the Canadian RPM Dance/Urban chart, number 25 on the US Billboard Hot Dance Music/Maxi-Singles Sales chart, number 43 in New Zealand and number 83 in Australia.

Airplay 
"Rock My Heart" entered the European airplay chart Border Breakers at number 16 on 26 March 1994 due to crossover airplay in West Central-, West-, North West- and South-Europe. It peaked at the third position on 23 April.

Music video 
The accompanying music video for "Rock My Heart" features Haddaway in a desert-like setting along with backing singer Natascha Wright, who has also worked with DJ BoBo and La Bouche. She appears like a tall tree-like creature with her hair looking like twigs. In between, dancers painted in gold and silver performs. Haddaway also performs choreography with them in some scenes. The video received heavy rotation on MTV Europe and was A-listed on Germany's VIVA.

Track listings 

 7-inch single
"Rock My Heart" (radio mix) – 3:57
"Rock My Heart" (album mix) – 4:16

 12-inch single
"Rock My Heart" (extended mix) – 5:58
"Rock My Heart" (radio mix) – 4:08
"Rock My Heart" (Celebration mix) – 5:48
"Rock My Heart" (Trime'N Delgado club mix) – 5:43

 CD single
 "Rock My Heart" (radio mix) – 3:57
 "Rock My Heart" (extended mix) – 5:55

 CD maxi
 "Rock My Heart" (radio mix) – 3:57
 "Rock My Heart" (extended mix) – 5:55
 "Rock My Heart" (Celebration mix) – 5:58
 "Rock My Heart" (Trime'n Delgado club mix) – 5:56

Charts

Weekly charts

Year-end charts

Release history

References 

1994 singles
1993 songs
English-language German songs
Eurodance songs
Haddaway songs
Logic Records singles
Number-one singles in Israel
Songs about dancing
Songs about music
Songs written by Tony Hendrik